All Rise is the second full-length album recorded by Chicago punk rock band Naked Raygun in 1985 and released on LP by Homestead Records in 1986. When Quarterstick Records re-released all of Naked Raygun's early albums in the late 90s, two bonus tracks were added to the CD album.

All Rise is the first Naked Raygun album to feature Pierre Kezdy on bass and Eric Spicer on drums, though all of the album's songs had been written by vocalist Jeff Pezzati and guitarist John Haggerty before Kezdy and Spicer joined the band. At least one song, "New Dreams", was written during earlier incarnations of the band and a live version appears as a bonus track to the band's Basement Screams EP from 1983.

Track listing

Personnel 
Naked Raygun
Jeff Pezzati – vocals
John Haggerty – guitar
Pierre Kezdy – bass guitar
Eric Spicer – drums
Production and additional personnel
Steve Albini – design
Iain Burgess – production
Rick A. Cosaro – photography, design
Naked Raygun – production

References

External links 
 

1986 albums
Albums produced by Iain Burgess
Homestead Records albums
Naked Raygun albums